Julio Mboumba (born 1 January 1965) is a Gabonese boxer. He competed in the men's lightweight event at the 1996 Summer Olympics.

References

External links
 

1965 births
Living people
Gabonese male boxers
Olympic boxers of Gabon
Boxers at the 1996 Summer Olympics
Place of birth missing (living people)
Lightweight boxers
21st-century Gabonese people